The 2006 Navy Midshipmen football team represented the United States Naval Academy (USNA) as an independent during the 2006 NCAA Division I FBS football season. The team was led by fifth-year head coach Paul Johnson.

Schedule

References

Navy
Navy Midshipmen football seasons
Navy Midshipmen football